Arzl may refer to:
 Arzl, Innsbruck, a borough of Innsbruck, Austria
 Arzl im Pitztal, a municipality in Austria

See also 
 Arzel